Duggar is a cultural and historical region in the northern part of Indian subcontinent, comprising the Jammu region of Jammu and Kashmir, northern Punjab, India, north-eastern part of Punjab, Pakistan and western Himachal Pradesh. It is the historical homeland of the Dogra people.

Etymology 
The linguist George Grierson connected the term Duggar with the Rajasthani word Doonger which means 'hill', and Dogra with Donger. This opinion has lacked support because of the inconsistency of the ostensible changes from Rajasthani to Dogri (essentially the question of how Doonger became Duggar while Donger became Dogra), and has been contradicted by some scholars.

Yet another proposal stems from the word Durgara, the name of a kingdom mentioned in an eleventh century copper-plate inscription in the Bhuri Singh Museum in Chamba, Himachal Pradesh. The word Durgara means 'invincible' in several Northern Indo-Aryan languages, and could be an allusion to the ruggedness of the terrain of Duggar and the historically militarised and autonomous Dogra societies.

An article by Dharam Chand Prashant in the literary magazine Shiraza Dogri suggested that "the opinion that the word Duggar is a form of the word Duggarh sounds appropriate."

Demographics 
The most spoken languages in this region are Dogri, Punjabi, Pahari-Pothwari, Gojri, Kangri, Himachali-Pahari, Hindi, Kashmiri and Urdu.

Almost equal percentages of the population practise Islam and Hinduism. Muslims form a majority in the western parts of Jammu division, and Sialkot and Narowal. Hindus constitute a majority in the rest of the region. Sikhism is practised by a sizeable minority, with a strong presence in Gurdaspur and Hoshiarpur.

See also 
 Dogras
 Dogri language
 Jammu division
 Name Dogra Akkhar

References 

Divided regions
Dogra
Historical Indian regions
 Historical regions of Pakistan